Jan Sverker Andreas Salomonsson (born December 19, 1973) is a Swedish former professional ice hockey player who played briefly in the National Hockey League.

Originally drafted in 2001 by the New Jersey Devils, Salomonsson was claimed on waivers by the Washington Capitals in 2002.  Following the 2002–03 NHL season, Salomonsson returned to play for Modo Hockey in the Swedish Elite League, where he had previously played for many years before his brief time in North America.

On February 11, 2010, Salomonsson retired due to an unhealed groin injury.

Career statistics

Regular season and playoffs

International

References

External links

1973 births
Living people
People from Örnsköldsvik Municipality
Swedish ice hockey left wingers
Swedish expatriate ice hockey players in Germany
Swedish expatriate ice hockey players in the United States
New Jersey Devils players
Albany River Rats players
Washington Capitals players
Portland Pirates players
EC Ratinger Löwen players
Modo Hockey players
Djurgårdens IF Hockey players
New Jersey Devils draft picks
Sportspeople from Västernorrland County